Glorieux is a surname. Notable people with the surname include:

Achille Glorieux (1910–1999), French prelate, Vatican official and diplomat
Alphonse Joseph Glorieux (1844–1917), Belgian missionary Roman Catholic bishop
Gabriel Glorieux (1930–2007), Belgian cyclist
Raphael Glorieux (1929–1986), Belgian cyclist

See also
, a second-rate 74-gun ship-of-the-line in the French Navy, later commissioned in the Royal Navy as HMS Glorieux
Le Glorieux (1984–2010), British-bred Thoroughbred racehorse
, various ships of the name
Les Corps glorieux, is a large organ cycle composed in the summer of 1939